Rodrigo Lara Bonilla (August 11, 1946 – April 30, 1984) was a Colombian lawyer and politician, who served as Minister of Justice under President Belisario Betancur, and was assassinated by orders of Pablo Escobar because of his work as Minister in prosecuting cocaine traffickers mainly belonging to the Medellín Cartel.

Lara's death led to Escobar's indictment for murder and a long-running controversy over extradition in Colombia that would ultimately cost thousands of lives.

Beginnings 
Born in Neiva, capital of the department of Huila, Lara studied law at the Universidad Externado de Colombia. Years later he joined the Liberal Revolutionary Movement party, founded and led by former Liberal president Alfonso López Michelsen. In 1969, when he was only 23 years old, Lara was appointed mayor of his hometown.

Minister of Justice 

In August 1983, Lara, who belonged to the New Liberalism created by him and Luis Carlos Galán, was appointed by President Belisario Betancur as Minister of Justice, replacing Bernardo Gaitán Mahecha. Lara, together with Galán, publicly denounced the drug cartels, especially in Medellín, where the cartel was led by Escobar. When Escobar was elected to the Congress, Lara denounced him, citing his connection to drug cartels. Lara also exposed Escobar and the cartel for influencing politics and sports through corruption. This triggered a trap set by some politicians, drug dealers, and journalists who were threatened by the explosive growth of Lara in government and especially in the fight against drug trafficking. Jairo Ortega, Escobar's ally in Congress, presented a check (eventually shown to have been falsified) to the chamber, supposedly drawn by known drug trafficker Evaristo Porras. This, in addition to a recorded conversation between Lara and Porras, caused many to question Lara's legitimacy. President Betancur, however, dismissed the allegations and retained Lara in office.

After the alleged link between Lara and the drug cartels was discredited, the government began uncovering the shadowy dealings of the Medellín Cartel, specifically Escobar. Escobar was expelled from the Congress and his U.S. visa cancelled. The Minister went further, reviving criminal charges against Escobar and other drug lords, such as Carlos Lehder. Lara also ordered the seizure of hundreds of planes and properties that were allegedly used for the production and distribution of illegal substances. While Congress debated approving an extradition treaty with the United States, Escobar and his allies sought to solve their problems by physically eliminating Lara.

Assassination 

On April 30, 1984  Rodrigo Lara Bonilla was in his 1976 Mercedes-Benz W123 when Byron Velasquez and Ivan Dario Guisado drove past his SUV convoy on a Yamaha motorcycle. Guisado shot an Mac-10 (9mm caliber)through the window hitting him multiple times. Lara was killed instantly, but the driver was  left unharmed. His bodyguards shot Ivan Dario Guisado dead but Byron Velasquez was arrested and was paroled on October 15 1995. Within a few days after Lara’s assassination Pablo Escobar and his family fled to Panama.

After Lara's death, the Betancur government immediately approved the extradition law and began a war against organized crime. In turn, Enrique Parejo González was appointed Minister of Justice. He directed a harsh attack against drug trafficking, leading to the extradition of three members of the Medellín Cartel to the United States.

In 2009, Rodrigo Lara Restrepo and the sons of the late Luis Carlos Galán announced to the media their forgiveness of Sebastian Marroquin (formerly Juan Pablo Escobar), son of the late Pablo Escobar, who apologized for the damage done to the country in his two decades of narco-terrorism, as told in the documentary film Sins of My Father (2009).

In popular culture 
In the Colombian Caracol TV series Escobar, el Patrón del Mal (2012), Lara is portrayed by the Colombian actor Ernesto Benjumea.

 In TV series Tres Caínes (2013), Lara is portrayed in a minor role by the Colombian actor Juan Carlos Serrano.

 In TV series Alias El Mexicano (2013), Lara is portrayed by the Colombian actor Fabio Rubiano.

The Netflix TV series Narcos (2015) (Season 1, Episode 3, "The Men of Always"), Lara (played by Mexican actor Adan Canto) is depicted denouncing Escobar and being assassinated.

 In TV Series En la boca del lobo is referred as Roberto Lora Pinilla.

References

1946 births
1984 deaths
People murdered by Colombian organized crime
Academic staff of the Free University of Colombia
Colombian Ministers of Justice
People from Huila Department
Assassinated Colombian politicians
Deaths by firearm in Colombia
People murdered in Colombia
Colombian politicians